The 1931 Singapore Open, also known as the 1931 Singapore Badminton Championships, took place from 11 July – 5 December 1931 at the S.V.C Drill Hall in City Hall, Singapore. The ties were played over a few months with the first round ties for the junior event being played on the 11th of July while senior events begin on the 18th of July and the last few ties were played on the 5th of December. It was the first time that the women's singles and doubles, mixed doubles, boys' singles and inter-club events were added to the calendar.

Two-times defending champion E.J. Vass defeated his long-time rival, See Gim Hock once again to clinch his third consecutive men's singles title while Alice Pennefather became the first women's singles champion after she beat E. da Silva comfortably in the final. In the men's doubles, Lim Boon Guan and Wee Eng Siang were crown champion for the first time when they overcame Koh Keng Siang and See Gim Hock in a thrilling three sets final. In the other doubles events, Maude Lewis and Alice Pennefather became the first women's doubles champion while the honor for mixed doubles went to E. J. Vass and J. de Souza. Lee Yang Chim became the first boys' singles champion and Diehard Badminton Party won the first-ever inter-club championship title.

Final results

References 

Singapore Open (badminton)
1931 in badminton